Alone at Last with Tony Bennett is the second album by American jazz singer Tony Bennett. It was released in 1955 as a 10" vinyl on Columbia (CL 2507) as part of "House Party Series". The orchestral players and technical staff are mentioned on the original packaging.

Track listing
"Sing You Sinners" (W. Franke Harling, Sam Coslow) – 2:12
"Somewhere Along the Way" (Kurt Adams, Sammy Gallop) - 2:59
"Since My Love Has Gone" (Giuseppe Verdi, Herbert Wasserman) - 2:59
"Stranger in Paradise" (Robert Wright, George Forrest) - 3:07
"Here in My Heart" (Pat Genaro, Lou Levinson, Bill Borrelli) - 2:53
"Please Driver (Once Around the Park Again)" (Chilton Price) - 3:04

Recorded on July 20, 1950 (#1),  May 31, 1951 (#3), October 17, 1951 (#2), April 30, 1952 (#5), October 13, 1953 (#4), December 4, 1953 (#6).

Personnel
Tony Bennett – vocals
Various orchestral players conducted by Percy Faith

References

1955 albums
Tony Bennett albums
Columbia Records albums